This is a list of events in South African sport in 1993.

Boxing
19 March - Ditau Molefyane wins the World Boxing Federation (WBF) junior lightweight title

Football (Soccer)

January
10 January - South Africa beats Botswana 2-0 at National Stadium, Gaborone, Botswana in a friendly match 
16 January - South Africa draws with Nigeria 0-0 at Soccer City, Johannesburg in the World Cup qualifiers
31 January - South Africa beats the Congo 1-0 at Municipal Stadium, Pointe Noire, Republic of the Congo in the World Cup qualifiers

April
11 April - South Africa draws with Mauritius 0-0 at Rand Stadium, Johannesburg in the African Nations Cup qualifiers
24 April - South Africa draws with Zimbabwe 1-1 at Soccer City, Johannesburg in the African Nations Cup qualifiers

July
11 July - South Africa loses to Zambia 0-3 at Independence Stadium, Lusaka, Zambia in the African Nations Cup qualifiers
25 July - South Africa beats the Mauritius 3-1 at Sir Anerood Jugnauth Stadium, Belle Vue, Mauritius in the African Nations Cup qualifiers

October
6 October - South Africa loses to Mexico 0-4 at the Los Angeles Memorial Coliseum, United States in a friendly match

Motorsport
14 March - The South African Grand Prix, is held at Kyalami

See also
1992 in South African sport
1993 in South Africa
1994 in South African sport
List of years in South African sport

 
South Africa